Howard Floyd Bier (born August 20, 1919) is an American former politician in the state of North Dakota. He served in the North Dakota House of Representatives from 1959 to 1972, and as Speaker of the House in 1971. Bier is married to Melvena (b. 1920). He turned 100 in August 2019.

References

1919 births
Living people
American centenarians
Republican Party members of the North Dakota House of Representatives
Men centenarians
North Dakota State College of Science alumni